Daniel Cornelius Roberts (born 20 January 1992) is a South African professional rugby union player, who most recently played with the . He is a utility back that usually plays as a fly-half or fullback, but has also started matches as a centre and winger.

Career

Youth

Roberts first earned a provincial call-up in 2010, when he was included in the SWD Eagles' Under-18 Academy Week squad. Later in the same year, he also featured for the  side in the 2010 Under-19 Provincial Championship.

Roberts was still eligible to represent newly promoted  in Group A of the 2011 Under-19 Provincial Championship. He started all twelve of their matches during the campaign, but his side found it hard to adjust to the higher league, losing all twelve of their matches.

He made six appearances for  during the 2012 Under-21 Provincial Championship, helping the side reach the final of the competition.

SWD Eagles

Despite still being eligible to play for the  side in the second half of 2013, he broke into the first team picture during the 2013 Currie Cup First Division.

Roberts was mainly used as a centre during the 2014 Vodacom Cup, starting all eight of the ' matches in the competition. He scored his first senior try in the second minute of their Round Two clash with Kenyan side  and followed it up with his second an hour later. He scored a third try in their match against  to end the season in third spot on the log to claim a quarter final spot. They were eliminated at that stage by  who ran out comfortable 84–15 winners.

Roberts then played in the 2014 Currie Cup qualification series, a competition which would reward the winner with a spot in the 2014 Currie Cup Premier Division. Roberts made four appearances and scored a try in their match against , but his side could only finish in fourth spot to play in the 2014 Currie Cup First Division.

Two appearances followed in the 2015 Vodacom Cup, where his side again reached the quarter final stage.

References

South African rugby union players
Living people
1992 births
People from Hessequa Local Municipality
Rugby union fly-halves
Rugby union centres
Rugby union wings
Rugby union fullbacks
SWD Eagles players
Rugby union players from the Western Cape